Ratu Viliame Navoka is a former civil servant who formerly held office as Fiji's Consul General in Sydney, Australia. From 2001 to 2006, he represented the Province of Nadroga-Navosa in the Senate as one of fourteen nominees of the Great Council of Chiefs.  He contested the Nadroga Open Constituency for the ruling Soqosoqo Duavata ni Lewenivanua (SDL) Party in the parliamentary election held on 6–13 May 2006, but was defeated by Mesulame Rakuro of the Fiji Labour Party (FLP). He died in 2007.

Viliame Navoka was a former student of Lelean Memorial School.

References

People educated at Lelean Memorial School
Fijian diplomats
I-Taukei Fijian members of the Senate (Fiji)
2007 deaths
Year of birth missing
Soqosoqo Duavata ni Lewenivanua politicians
Fijian civil servants
Politicians from Nadroga-Navosa Province